Bygdebladet Randaberg og Rennesøy (The Randaberg and Rennesøy Country Gazette) is a local Norwegian newspaper published in Randaberg in Rogaland county. The newspaper appears once a week and covers events in the municipalities of Randaberg, Rennesøy, Kvitsøy, and Finnøy. The newspaper was founded in 1997 and is edited by Kirsti K. Sømme.

Circulation
According to the Norwegian Media Businesses' Association, Bygdebladet Randaberg og Rennesøy has had the following annual circulation:
 2006: 3,024
 2007: 3,071
 2008: 3,231
 2009: 3,397
 2010: 3,483
 2011: 3,564
 2012: 3,485
 2013: 3,345
 2014: 3,456
 2015: 3,482
 2016: 3,396

References

External links
Bygdebladet Randaberg og Rennesøy home page

Weekly newspapers published in Norway
Norwegian-language newspapers
Mass media in Rogaland
Randaberg
Newspapers established in 1997
1997 establishments in Norway